The Hampdenshire Wonder is a 1911 science fiction novel by J. D. Beresford. It is one of the first novels to involve a wunderkind. The child in it, Victor Stott, is the son of a famous cricket player. This origin is perhaps a reference to H.G. Wells's father Joseph Wells. The novel concerns his progress from infant to almost preternaturally brilliant child. Victor Stott is subtly deformed to allow for his powerful brain. One prominent, and unpleasant, character is the local minister. As Beresford's father was a minister, and Beresford was himself partially disabled, some see autobiographical aspects to the story. However this is unproven.

What is more concrete is that the story of Christian Heinrich Heineken was an inspiration for the story. Whether the biography of that child prodigy was accurate or not, "the Lubeck prodigy" is mentioned in the work. In the original version, the progressionist ideas of Henri Bergson on evolution were a significant influence.

References

Sources

 George M. Johnson. J.D. Beresford. New York: Twayne/Simon and Schuster, 1998.
 George M. Johnson. "The Other Side of Edwardian Fiction: Two Forgotten Fantasy Novels of 1911" Wormwood: Literature of the fantastic, supernatural and decadent. U.K., No. 16 (Spring 2011) 3–15.
 George M. Johnson. "Evil is in the Eye of the Beholder: Threatening Children in Two Edwardian Speculative Satires". Science Fiction Studies. Vol. 41, No.1 (March 2014): 26–44.

External links
  
SF Site review of "The Wonder" 
Review at a science fiction webzine

1911 British novels
British science fiction novels
1911 science fiction novels
Novels by J. D. Beresford
Sidgwick & Jackson books